Shosh or Shushikend is a village de facto in the Askeran Province of the breakaway Republic of Artsakh, de jure in the Khojaly District of Azerbaijan, in the disputed region of Nagorno-Karabakh. The village has an ethnic Armenian-majority population and also had an Armenian majority in 1989.

History 
Shosh's name and history is connected to that of Shusha (Shushi), which is located a short distance from the village. The Armenian historian Leo considered it likely that the village Shosh received its name from Shushi, which he considered the older settlement, although some sources say that Shushi received its name from the village. 

During the Soviet period, the village was part of the Askeran District of the Nagorno-Karabakh Autonomous Oblast. The village has been administered by the Republic of Artsakh since the First Nagorno-Karabakh War. 

After the 2020 Nagorno-Karabakh war, five Armenian families displaced from Vazgenashen (Gulably) settled in the village, as well as in Ivanyan (Khojaly).

Historical heritage sites 
There are three Armenian churches in the village, the 19th-century church of Surb Astvatsatsin in the village centre, St. Stephen's Church built in 1655 on the village cemetery grounds, and above the village on a hill in the north, there is a church with an adjacent cemetery with khachkars. The 19th-century chapel of Karmir Taran is also located in the village. Other historical heritage sites in and around the village include the medieval shrine of Shoghasar, a 17th-century khachkar, the 18th-century bridge of Dzakhlik, and a 19th-century watermill. A monument in honor of the 18th-century Armenian satirist and fabulist Pele Pughi was built in 1976 between Shosh and Mkhitarashen.

Economy and culture 
The population is mainly engaged in agriculture and animal husbandry. As of 2015, the village has a municipal building, a house of culture, a secondary school, four shops, and a medical centre.

Demographics 
The village had 544 inhabitants in 2005, and 641 inhabitants in 2015.

Notable people 
 Arsen Terteryan (1882-1953) – Soviet Armenian scientist and writer
 Pele Pughi (1731-1810) – Armenian satirist and fabulist

Gallery

References

External links 

 
 

Populated places in Askeran Province
Populated places in Khojaly District